Danville Airport may refer to:

 Danville Airport (FAA: 8N8) in Danville, Pennsylvania, United States
 Danville Municipal Airport (FAA: 32A) in Danville, Arkansas, United States
 Danville Regional Airport (FAA: DAN) in Danville, Virginia, United States

Other airports in places named Danville:
 Stuart Powell Field (FAA: DVK) in Danville, Kentucky, United States
 Vermilion Regional Airport (FAA: DNV) in Danville, Illinois, United States